Paraodontomma is an extinct genus of ommatid beetle, it is known from three species, P. burmiticum described in 2017, P. szwedoi described in 2018. and P. leptocristatum in 2021. All 3 species are known from the Cenomanian aged Burmese amber.

References 

Burmese amber
Ommatidae
Prehistoric insect genera